Palo Alto County is a county located in the U.S. state of Iowa. As of the 2020 census, the population was 8,996. The county seat is Emmetsburg. It is named after the Battle of Palo Alto, the first major battle of the Mexican–American War.

Geography

Major highways
  U.S. Highway 18
  Iowa Highway 4
  Iowa Highway 15

Adjacent counties
 Emmet County (north)
 Kossuth County (east)
 Pocahontas County (south)
 Clay County (west)

Demographics

2020 census
There were 4,516 housing units, of which 3,831 were occupied.

2010 census
There were 4,628 housing units, of which 3,994 were occupied.

2000 census

As of the census of 2000, there were 10,147 people, 4,119 households, and 2,673 families residing in the county. The population density was 18 people per square mile (7/km2). There were 4,631 housing units at an average density of 8 per square mile (3/km2). The racial makeup of the county was 98.62% White, 0.09% Black or African American, 0.19% Native American, 0.31% Asian, 0.04% Pacific Islander, 0.19% from other races, and 0.57% from two or more races. 0.76% of the population were Hispanic or Latino of any race.

There were 4,119 households, out of which 28.50% had children under the age of 18 living with them, 56.30% were married couples living together, 5.90% had a female householder with no husband present, and 35.10% were non-families. 30.40% of all households were made up of individuals, and 16.10% had someone living alone who was 65 years of age or older. The average household size was 2.37 and the average family size was 2.96.

In the county, the population was spread out, with 24.00% under the age of 18, 9.50% from 18 to 24, 23.20% from 25 to 44, 21.90% from 45 to 64, and 21.30% who were 65 years of age or older. The median age was 41 years. For every 100 females there were 94.70 males. For every 100 females age 18 and over, there were 92.10 males.

The median income for a household in the county was $32,409, and the median income for a family was $41,808. Males had a median income of $28,344 versus $19,655 for females. The per capita income for the county was $17,733. About 6.60% of families and 10.60% of the population were below the poverty line, including 12.20% of those under age 18 and 9.10% of those age 65 or over.

Communities

 Ayrshire
 Curlew
 Cylinder
 Emmetsburg
 Graettinger
 Mallard
 Rodman
 Ruthven
 West Bend (partially)

Townships

 Booth
 Ellington
 Emmetsburg
 Fairfield
 Fern Valley
 Freedom
 Great Oak
 Highland
 Independence
 Lost Island
 Nevada
 Rush Lake
 Silver Lake
 Vernon
 Walnut
 West Bend

Population ranking
The population ranking of the following table is based on the 2020 census of Palo Alto County.

† county seat

Politics

See also

 National Register of Historic Places listings in Palo Alto County, Iowa

References

External links

 Palo Alto County Economic Development
 

 
1851 establishments in Iowa
Populated places established in 1851